Rybakov (masculine) or Rybakova (feminine) is a Russian surname, which is derived from the Russian word "рыбак" (fisher, angler). Notable people with the surname include:
 Alex Rybakov (born 1997), American tennis player
 Alexey V. Rybakov, Russian carcinologist 
 Anatoly Rybakov (1911–1998), Russian writer, author of Children of the Arbat and Heavy sand
 Anatoly Rybakov (swimmer) (born 1956), Russian swimmer
 Boris Rybakov (1908–2001), orthodox Soviet historian
 Maria Rybakova (born 1973), Russian writer, granddaughter of Anatoly Rybakov
 Nikolay Rybakov (born 1978), Russian politician
 Viktor Rybakov (born 1956), boxer of the USSR
 Vladimir Rybakov (1947–2018), Russian writer, author of The Afghans and Creature
 Vyacheslav Rybakov (born 1954), Russian science fiction writer and an orientalist
 Yaroslav Rybakov (born 1980), Russian athlete

Occupational surnames

Russian-language surnames